The National Union of Tailors and Garment Workers (NUTGW) was a trade union in the United Kingdom.

History

The union was founded as the Tailors and Garment Workers' Union (T&GWU) in 1920 with the merger of the Scottish Operative Tailors and Tailoresses' Association and the United Garment Workers' Union.  In 1932, it was joined by the Amalgamated Society of Tailors and Tailoresses and renamed itself as the "National Union of Tailors and Garment Workers".  In 1939 it absorbed the United Ladies Tailors' Trade Union. The NUTGW had 118,700 members in 1945, making it the tenth largest union in Britain. It absorbed the Manchester-based Waterproof Garment Workers' Trade Union in 1972.

The NUTGW faced a long-term decline in membership over the second half of the 20th century as the number of workers employed in the British clothing industry shrunk. This was largely due to competition with foreign manufacturers. By 1990 membership had fallen to less than 70,000, from a peak of over 130,000 in 1950. The NUTGW merged into the General, Municipal, Boilermakers and Allied Trades Union in 1991.

Election results
The union sponsored a Labour Party Member of Parliament from 1958 until 1964.

General Secretaries
1920: Andrew Conley
1948: Anne Loughlin
1953: John E. Newton
1969: Jack Macgougan
1979: Alec Smith

References

External links
Catalogue of the NUTGW archives, held at the Modern Records Centre, University of Warwick

Trade unions established in 1920
Trade unions disestablished in 1991
Defunct trade unions of the United Kingdom
Clothing industry trade unions
1920 establishments in the United Kingdom
GMB (trade union) amalgamations
Trade unions based in London